Creep is a 2014 American found footage psychological horror film directed by Patrick Brice, his directorial debut, from a story by Brice and Mark Duplass, who both star in the film. Filmed as found footage, Brice portrays a videographer assigned to record an eccentric client, played by Duplass. Creep was inspired by Brice's experiences on Craigslist and the movies My Dinner with Andre, Misery, and Fatal Attraction. Brice and Duplass refined the film's story during filming, which resulted in multiple versions of each scene and several alternate end scenarios.

The film premiered on March 8, 2014, at South by Southwest, and was released on video on demand on June 23, 2015, by The Orchard prior to an international release via Netflix on July 14, 2015. It received positive reviews from critics and has a Rotten Tomatoes approval rating of 90%. A sequel was released in 2017, also directed by Brice and starring Duplass, with a third film planned for a future release.

Plot
Struggling videographer Aaron accepts an assignment to travel to a remote cabin, where he meets his client Josef. Josef explains that he has an inoperable brain tumor and is expected to die before his pregnant wife Angela gives birth, so he wishes to have Aaron record a video diary for his unborn child. Throughout the day, Josef demonstrates eccentric behavior that makes Aaron uneasy, which culminates in Josef confessing that he raped his wife. As an increasingly-disturbed Aaron is hindered from departing by being unable to locate his car keys, he intercepts a phone call from Angela, who reveals she is actually Josef's sister and urges Aaron to escape. Josef, however, attempts to stop Aaron from leaving, leading to a scuffle that ends with Aaron getting away.

Back at his home, Aaron starts receiving items in the mail from Josef, including a recording of Josef digging a grave. The police are unable to take action due to Aaron's knowing little about Josef, who Aaron realizes is stalking him. A final DVD is sent to Aaron, in which Josef offers to meet him in a public park to make amends. Aaron accepts Josef's offer, but places a camera on himself and sets his phone to  dial the police as a precaution. While Aaron waits on a park bench for Josef to arrive, Josef kills him from behind with an axe. Reviewing the footage, Josef questions why Aaron did not turn around in the moments leading up to his death. He concludes that Aaron believed he was a good person who would not harm him and because of this, he declares Aaron to be his favorite victim.

Josef, now calling himself Bill, later receives a phone call from his newest target as he places a DVD of Aaron's murder alongside recordings of his past victims.

Cast
 Mark Duplass as Josef/Bill
 Patrick Brice as Aaron

Duplass' real-life spouse Katie Aselton makes an uncredited appearance as the voice of Angela.

Production
Duplass said that the film's story "was inspired by character-driven dramas that are, at their heart, two-handers: My Dinner with Andre, Misery, and Fatal Attraction" as well as "[his] myriad of strange Craigslist experiences over the years." Brice and Duplass originally began working on Creep under the working title Peachfuzz after the wolf mask owned by Duplass' character, but chose to rename the film as the title's relevance came later in the movie's plot and they did not want viewers to "spend the first half hour trying to figure out why the movie is called Peachfuzz and [not] pay attention to the very intricate details". The two built the movie from a series of conversations they had with one another and decided to refine Creep while they were filming, which enabled them to film and screen portions of the film to see what would or would not work on camera. As a result, the film had multiple alternate end scenarios and Duplass stated that there were "10 to 12 permutations of each scene".

Of the creative process for his character, Josef, Duplass explained: "We were interested in the psychological profile of this very, very strange person. We were very interested in how you meet people and don’t quite understand what’s up, but you start to get signs. For us that was intense eye contact, lack of personal space, oversharing, maybe a little bit too much love here and there. But, for me, there’s something wrong with both of these guys. Deeply. This concept of, 'who is the creep in this scenario?'"

Release
Creep received a world premiere at the South by Southwest film festival on March 8, 2014, and film rights were purchased by RADiUS-TWC shortly thereafter. Plans for an October 2014 video on demand release fell through, when RADiUS didn't release the film. In June 2015, The Orchard and Sony Pictures Home Entertainment (Orchard's parent company) acquired distribution rights to the film. The film was released on June 23, 2015, on video on demand, prior to a global release on Netflix on July 14, 2015.

Home media
Creep was released on DVD on April 5, 2016, from Sony Pictures Home Entertainment.

Reception
Creep received positive reviews from critics. On Rotten Tomatoes the film has an approval rating of 90% based on 31 reviews, with an average rating of 7.30/10. The critical consensus states, "a smart, oddball take on found-footage horror, Creep is clever and well-acted enough to keep viewers on the edges of their seats". On Metacritic, the film has a score of 74 out of 100, based on 6 reviews, indicating "generally favorable reviews".

The Hollywood Reporter and Indiewire both gave the film positive reviews, and Indiewire noted that although the film had its flaws, they mostly worked in Creep's favor. Variety remarked that Creep "could have been more effective if Duplass’ performance were a shade more ambiguous, and the audience had a chance to at least fleetingly believe Josef might be telling the truth" but that "despite the blatancy of his character’s ulterior motives, Duplass scores a considerable impact by making the most of the aforementioned plot twists."

Shock Till You Drop panned the movie overall, stating that "Creep might work for those don't regularly digest horror films, but for the hardened fan, this is a film that spins its wheels all too often and feels like an exercise in self-indulgence."

Sequels

Shortly after Creep's premiere at South by Southwest, Duplass announced that he intended to film a sequel. After the film distribution rights were purchased by RADiUS-TWC, he further announced that he was planning on creating a trilogy. In August 2014, Duplass further stated that he and Brice planned on filming the second Creep film at the end of the year, that the film's cast would be announced during that time, and that the trilogy would be completed in 2015. However, in February 2015, Duplass commented that neither he nor Brice had been able to start filming on Creep 2 due to scheduling issues, as the careers of both men had greatly expanded since Creep release, but that the both of them were still actively developing the project. In May 2016, Duplass and Brice announced discussions had begun on the sequel. In August 2016, Duplass revealed that he had begun trying on costumes for the film.

In September 2016, it was announced production had begun on the film, with Duplass returning, and Desiree Akhavan joining the cast, with Brice returning as the director. Creep 2 premiered at the  Sitges Film Festival on October 6, 2017, and was released through video on demand on October 24, 2017. On Rotten Tomatoes, the film has an approval rating of 100% based on 24 reviews, with an average rating of 7.6/10.

Brice and Duplass announced plans to create a third film, titled Creep 3. In March 2020, they stated that they were struggling to come up with a concept as they wanted the third film to be "super inspired".

See also
 List of films featuring home invasions

Notes

References

External links
 

2014 films
2014 horror films
American horror thriller films
American independent films
American psychological horror films
Found footage films
Blumhouse Productions films
Films about stalking
Films produced by Jason Blum
Duplass Brothers Productions films
American serial killer films
The Orchard (company) films
Films directed by Patrick Brice
Two-handers
2014 directorial debut films
2014 independent films
2010s English-language films
2010s American films